Woodruff Park is an  urban park located in and administered by the city of Olympia, Washington. Amenities include a seasonal sprayground, picnic shelter, restrooms, volleyball court, tennis and pickleball courts, and a basketball half-court.

Woodruff Park was named after Samuel C. Woodruff, Jr., who in effect donated the property to the city in 1892 for just $1. The park sits at the crest of Olympia's westside hill, between the arterial Harrison Avenue and Garfield Elementary School.

References

Parks in Olympia, Washington